Charles de la Cerda, commonly known as Charles of Spain (1327 – 8 January 1354), was a Franco-Castilian nobleman and soldier, the son of Alfonso de la Cerda of Spain (died 1327) and Isabelle d'Antoing, and grandson of Alfonso de la Cerda the disinherited (1270–1333). He was a distant cousin of John II of France.

A boyhood companion and favorite of John while he was Duke of Normandy, Charles commanded the Castilian galleys at the Battle of L'Espagnols-sur-Mer, where he was defeated by Edward III of England after a long and desperate struggle. Soon after John's accession to the throne, he was appointed Constable of France, filling the vacancy left by the execution of Raoul II, Count of Eu, and created Count of Angoulême. Vacant since the death of Joan II of Navarre in 1349, the title to Angoulême was claimed by her son, Charles II, King of Navarre, who bitterly resented La Cerda's preferment. In 1351, Charles de la Cerda married Marguerite, a daughter of Charles, Duke of Brittany.

In 1354, Charles of Navarre and several members of his household set upon and slew de la Cerda in an inn in L'Aigle. The repercussions of this murder led to a continuous state of instability within France that was only resolved upon the accession of Charles V in 1364.

References

Sources

 

|-

|-

1327 births
1354 deaths
Counts of Angoulême
Charles
People murdered in France
Assassinated French people
Assassinated Spanish people
People of the Hundred Years' War
Constables of France